The graveyard of empires is a sobriquet often associated with Afghanistan. It originates from the numerous historical examples of foreign powers such as the Achaemenid Empire, Macedonia, Umayyad Caliphate, Mongol Empire, Timurid Empire, Mughal Empire, Sikh Empire, British Empire, the Soviet Union, and the United States being unable to achieve military victory in Afghanistan. Furthermore, all foreign armies that have invaded Afghanistan have conducted a full military withdrawal by the end of the conflict. Alternatively, the term has been applied to Mesopotamia. Elsewhere, a very similar phrase, "the graveyard of nations and empires," has been used in a figurative sense to describe the Old Testament's Book of Isaiah. It is unclear who coined the phrase, and its historical accuracy has been disputed.

Background

During the history of Afghanistan, several great powers have attempted to invade Afghanistan without maintaining a stable, permanent rule. Modern examples included the British Empire during the First, Second, and Third Anglo-Afghan Wars (1839–1842, 1878–1880, 1919); the Soviet Union in the Soviet–Afghan War (1979–1989); and the United States in the War in Afghanistan (2001–2021). Some have attributed ancient and medieval empires to the narrative, including the Persians, Greeks, Arabs, Turks, and Mongols. The difficulty in invading Afghanistan was attributed to the prevalence of fortress-like qalats, the deserts, the mountainous terrain of Afghanistan, its severe winter and its enduring clan loyalties, various empires fighting each other while attempting to conquer Afghanistan, and outside neighboring countries support such as Pakistan, where foreign invaders were unable or not permitted to cross into such nations to destroy their enemy sanctuaries.

Usage
The anthropologist Thomas Barfield has noted that the narrative of Afghanistan as an unconquerable nation has been used by Afghanistan itself to deter invaders. In October 2001, during the United States invasion of Afghanistan, the Taliban founder and leader Mohammed Omar Mujahid threatened the United States with the same fate as the British Empire and the Soviet Union. US President Joe Biden referred to the sobriquet while he delivered a public statement after the 2021 fall of Kabul as evidence that no further commitment of American military presence would consolidate the Islamic Republic of Afghanistan against the Taliban.

Criticism
The New York Times foreign correspondent Rod Nordland has stated that "in truth, no great empires perished solely because of Afghanistan." Joint Services Command and Staff College lecturer Patrick Porter called the attribution "a false extrapolation from something that is true - that there is tactical and strategic difficulty." 

The British Empire was not destroyed after the Third Anglo-Afghan War, and the collapse of the British Empire was more commonly attributed to World War II. While the Soviet–Afghan War was a major factor in the dissolution of the Soviet Union, the opposition in Afghanistan was only possible with foreign aid, primarily from the United States. Furthermore, there is reason to believe that the Soviet Union would have collapsed regardless of the campaign. Nonetheless, the narrative allowed for argument from analogy and the thesis of "history repeating itself," which proved accepted amongst authors and political experts.

References

Bibliography 

 
 

Military history of Afghanistan
Political history of Afghanistan
Nicknames